The Blum–Goldwasser (BG) cryptosystem is an asymmetric key encryption algorithm proposed by Manuel Blum and Shafi Goldwasser in 1984.  Blum–Goldwasser is a probabilistic, semantically secure cryptosystem with a constant-size ciphertext expansion.  The encryption algorithm implements an XOR-based stream cipher using the Blum-Blum-Shub (BBS) pseudo-random number generator to generate the keystream.  Decryption is accomplished by manipulating the final state of the BBS generator using the private key, in order to find the initial seed and reconstruct the keystream.

The BG cryptosystem is semantically secure based on the assumed intractability of integer factorization; specifically, factoring a composite value  where  are large primes.  BG has multiple advantages over earlier probabilistic encryption schemes such as the Goldwasser–Micali cryptosystem.  First, its semantic security reduces solely to integer factorization, without requiring any additional assumptions (e.g., hardness of the quadratic residuosity problem or the RSA problem).  Secondly, BG is efficient in terms of storage, inducing a constant-size ciphertext expansion regardless of message length. BG is also relatively efficient in terms of computation, and fares well even in comparison with cryptosystems such as RSA (depending on message length and exponent choices).  However, BG is highly vulnerable to adaptive chosen ciphertext attacks (see below).  

Because encryption is performed using a probabilistic algorithm, a given plaintext may produce very different ciphertexts each time it is encrypted.  This has significant advantages, as it prevents an adversary from recognizing intercepted messages by comparing them to a dictionary of known ciphertexts.

Operation

The Blum–Goldwasser cryptosystem consists of three algorithms: a probabilistic key generation algorithm which produces a public and a private key, a probabilistic encryption algorithm, and a deterministic decryption algorithm.

Key generation
The public and private keys are generated as follows:
 Compute .
Then  is the public key and the pair  is the private key.

Encryption
A message  is encrypted with the public key  as follows:
 Compute the block size in bits, .
 Convert  to a sequence of  blocks , where each block is  bits in length.
 Select a random integer .
 Compute .
 For  from 1 to 
 Compute .
 Compute .
 Finally, compute .
The encryption of the message  is then all the  values plus the final  value: .

Decryption
An encrypted message  can be decrypted with the private key  as follows:
 Compute .
 Compute .
 Compute .
 Compute .
 Using the Extended Euclidean Algorithm, compute  and  such that .
 Compute . This will be the same value which was used in encryption (see proof below).  can then used to compute the same sequence of  values as were used in encryption to decrypt the message, as follows.
 For  from 1 to 
 Compute .
 Compute .
 Finally, reassemble the values  into the message .

Example
To encrypt the six-bit message , we break it into two 3-bit blocks , so . We select a random  and compute . Now we compute the  values as follows:
 

To decrypt, we compute
 

It can be seen that  has the same value as in the encryption algorithm. Decryption therefore proceeds the same as encryption:

Proof of correctness
We must show that the value  computed in step 6 of the decryption algorithm is equal to the value computed in step 4 of the encryption algorithm.

In the encryption algorithm, by construction  is a quadratic residue modulo . It is therefore also a quadratic residue modulo , as are all the other  values obtained from it by squaring. Therefore, by Euler's criterion, . Then

Similarly, 
  
Raising the first equation to the power  we get
 
Repeating this  times, we have
 
 
And by a similar argument we can show that .

Security and efficiency 

The Blum–Goldwasser scheme is semantically-secure based on the hardness of predicting the keystream bits given only the final BBS state  and the public key . However, ciphertexts of the form  are vulnerable to an adaptive chosen ciphertext attack in which the adversary requests the decryption  of a chosen ciphertext .

Depending on plaintext size, BG may be more or less computationally expensive than RSA.  Because most RSA deployments use a fixed encryption exponent optimized to minimize encryption time, RSA encryption will typically outperform BG for all but the shortest messages.  However, as the RSA decryption exponent is randomly distributed, modular exponentiation may require a comparable number of squarings/multiplications to BG decryption for a ciphertext of the same length.  BG has the advantage of scaling more efficiently to longer ciphertexts, where RSA requires multiple separate encryptions.  In these cases, BG may be significantly more efficient.

References 

M. Blum, S. Goldwasser, "An Efficient Probabilistic Public Key Encryption Scheme which Hides All Partial Information", Proceedings of Advances in Cryptology - CRYPTO '84, pp. 289–299, Springer Verlag, 1985.
Menezes, Alfred; van Oorschot, Paul C.; and Vanstone, Scott A. Handbook of Applied Cryptography. CRC Press, October 1996.

External links
 Menezes, Oorschot, Vanstone, Scott: Handbook of Applied Cryptography (free PDF downloads), see Chapter 8

Public-key encryption schemes